Shaun Q. Morris is a United States Air Force lieutenant general currently serving as the commander of the Air Force Life Cycle Management Center. Previously, he was the commander of the Air Force Nuclear Weapons Center.

Effective dates of promotions

References

Air Command and Staff College alumni
Living people
National War College alumni
Place of birth missing (living people)
Recipients of the Air Force Distinguished Service Medal
Recipients of the Defense Superior Service Medal
Recipients of the Legion of Merit
United States Air Force Academy alumni
United States Air Force generals
University of Southern California alumni
Year of birth missing (living people)